Bart Chabot (The Hague, 26 September 1954) is a Dutch writer and poet.

Biography
Chabot went to the University of Leiden to study Dutch language and literature. During that period, he befriended the artists and drug users Jules Deelder and Herman Brood. Chabot's parents thoroughly disapproved. Soon after, Chabot decided to abandon his studies. In 1979, he made his debut as a poet with Als u zó gaat beginnen followed by Popcorn in 1981. Chabot did not want to cater to the world of literary critics, and attempted to write poetry everybody could understand with references to McDonalds, supermarkets, and rock-and-roll. Of his 1993 poetry collection Genadebrood, a reviewer in World Literature Today noted Chabot's cynical philosophy and commented on the depressing nature of many of the poems.

In 1996, Chabot wrote his first biography called Broodje gezond (Healthy sandwich) about Herman Brood. The book became a bestseller selling 50,000 copies by 2003, and received sequels as Broodje halfom (2001), Brood en spelen (2002) en Broodje springlevend (2003). In 2007, Chabot received the Johnny van Doorn Prize for literature. The biography even received critical acclaim from Arjan Peters of de Volkskrant for showing the degeneration of the elderly rock and roll singer while keeping a good sense of humour. The critic did show his prejudice for having to write about a common subject.

In 2014, Chabot composed the Grand Dictation of the Dutch Language which was an annual spelling contest organised by De Morgen, de Volkskrant and NTR. Chabot was a prominent participant in the previous editions of the spelling contest, and wanted to make it more accessible to normal people using familiar words. In 2020, Chabot published Mijn vaders hand, about his youth. Hebban expected a gloomy book, but Chabot's cynical irony managed to make them laugh once in a while. Hebban did question the commercial motivation of a television personality writing about his youth. Carel Peeters of Vrij Nederland observed that Chabot is always somewhere else, and that triggered him to go beyond acceptable and normal patterns.

Chabot is also a columnist for Oor and Playboy, and a television personality making frequent appearances on Pauw & Witteman and Barend & Van Dorp.

In 1989, Chabot embarked on a theatre tour with Remco Campert and Jan Mulder. In 1999 he decided to go on the road again this time with Jules Deelder and Herman Brood.

In autumn 2006, Chabot participated in the television program De Slimste Mens, which aimed to find the smartest person in a group of celebrities. Chabot won.

Family
Bart Chabot married Yolanda in 1987. The couple has four sons whom he taught to write. "Writing starts with empathy, you don't put yourself in the centre, but the world around you," according to Bart. The writing muse got passed on, and Sebastiaan and Splinter are columnists in their own right. Splinter had even gone beyond that, and has, after graduating from the University of Amsterdam, become a television presenter for NPO 3.

Works

References

External links

 Official site (in Dutch)
 Bart Chabot at Digital Library for Dutch Literature (in Dutch)
 

1954 births
Dutch male poets
Living people
Writers from The Hague
Leiden University alumni